PCNA-associated factor is a protein that in humans is encoded by the KIAA0101 gene.

Interactions 

KIAA0101 has been shown to interact with PCNA.

Model organisms 

Model organisms have been used in the study of KIAA0101 function. A conditional knockout mouse line called 2810417H13Riktm1a (EUCOMM)Wtsi was generated at the Wellcome Trust Sanger Institute. Male and female animals underwent a standardized phenotypic screen to determine the effects of deletion. Additional screens performed:  - In-depth immunological phenotyping - in-depth bone and cartilage phenotyping

References

Further reading